Diego Medrano Fernández (Oviedo, Spain, 1978) is a Spanish poet, narrator and regular columnist of Asturian newspaper El Comercio.

Life 
Begins philosophy studies in the Universidad de Oviedo, where, "after feeling like Oscar Wilde in prison", and telling himself a certain quote by Francois Mauriac -"Freedom and health are the same thing"- he soon leaves everything for the sake of his cyclopean literary vocation. "Perpetual writer, always writer", he is the heir of a tradition that combines decadence and culture in the same identity: Jean Lorrain, Charles Baudelaire, Max Jacob, Arthur Rimbaud, Emile Cioran, Louis Aragon, Louis-Ferdinand Celine, Georges Bataille among others.

He steps into the world of literature with the book: Los héroes inutiles (The Useless Heroes) (Ellago Ediciones, 2005), a complete collection of the correspondence that he held with Spanish "damned" writer Leopoldo María Panero, that serves as a literary poetic where the author, following two well-known sentences by Charles Baudelaire, declares himself "hero" and "useless". His first poetry book, also published in 2005: El hombre entre las rocas (The Man Among the Rocks) (Arena Libros) is a sort of writing notebook in which he entwines the poetic with the narrative in a same coherent unity, similar to Jean Cocteau or René Char, where the former (poetic) is always destined to triumph over the latter (narrative).

He publishes his first novel El clítoris de Camille (Camille's Clitoris) (Seix Barral) in early 2006, a transgressive novel that is practically impossible to label or classify. This novel was surrounded in controversy for constituting the solid monologue of a decadent mentally ill writer facing a love process, a surprising novel, tinged by the use of a most peculiar and deconstructive syntax and a not less provoking language. Also in 2006, he published a book of micro-stories, Los sueños diurnos. Manual para amantes, pobres y asesinos (Daylight Dreams. Instructions for lovers, beggars and murderers) (Cahoba Narrativa) which is the sum of over 300 micro-stories and over 600 characters, filled with quotes and "illuminations", where he followed the composition processes of Robert Walser and his Mikrogramme (Micrograms).

In 2007, with La soledad no tiene edad (Loneliness Has No Age) (Septem), Diego Medrano combines extensive and short stories, the titles of which should give an accurate orientation: Bragas (Panties), Nembutal, Urinarios (Urinals), Mahou, Atapuerca, Sirenas (Sirens)... 272 pages for readers ready for everything. In 2008, Medrano returns with the poetry book Agua me falta (Got No Water) (Septem).

The first volume of his diaries, Diario del artista echado a perder (Diary Of The Wasted Artist), constitutes a convulse "Dictionary of the lousy" -dozens and dozens of "damned" and "cursed" artists- with the author's own life, no less heterodox or singular.

He also published other poetry books such as: El viento muerde (The Wind Bites) and A veces cuerdo (Sometimes Sane).

Works

Poetry

El hombre entre las rocas (The Man Among The Rocks)
Between Oficio de tinieblas 5 (Trade of Darkness 5) by Camilo José Cela –for searching a new and unruly order in literature- and the Petites Poemes en Prose (Little Poems in Prose) by Charles Baudelaire –for their poetic nature concentrated in the minimal narrative structure- comes Medrano's "El hombre entre las rocas". Between Oppium (Opium: The Diary of a Cure) by Jean Cocteau –for its attempt at a constant diary of all work- and James Joyce's Finnegans Wake –in its plausible attempt to fixate an episodic syntax, through formulas that the author plays with and is not going to give up- appears this little jewel. With the freedom of Samuel Beckett –letting the verbal river flow- and the aphasia of Louis-Ferdinand Celine –unworried about the style that his own work germinates- Medrano elaborates this little verbal artifact, without comparison in our days, the modernity of which is that of the very tradition that is assimilated – the quoted authors and many others- trying its maximum use as conscience lash and sublime purge of styles.

El viento muerde (The Wind Bites)
This poetry book is "pure linguistic fact", in what Roland Barthes could have said, or any other structuralist for that matter. On one hand, always with Barthes in mind, Medrano declares himself Barthes' subject-monster: "he who forces the loved one in a relentless net of tyrannys". On the other hand, always in the monstruous territories, the author fantasizes with all kinds of cultural references, in a novísimical or horrifying turn: poem dedicated to Mozart learning to play the piano, different approximations to Giacometti, bombings over Guernika, tributes to Capote and Michaux, fascination for Ezra Pound. In a very personal metric and rhythm, he created this "textual wakefulness", as he refers to it himself, in one of his many other fugues of other books with which he was occupied at that moment, without any other calm or polarity than to go on getting lost. Poetry book that is a book of mirrors and book of poems, that is a novel, narrativity, in a bohemian crossing of sad paintings, over any other blunt plastic. An immense "boutade", to name it El viento muerde (The Wind Bites), referring to certain verses by Lorca ("And over the slate roofs / the wind, furious, bites") when it is exactly the opposite: concept or sensation, much rather than tambourine or red moon.

A veces cuerdo (Sometimes Sane)
With portico by Pere Gimferrer, this book of poetic aphorisms or emphatic flashes belongs to the most authentic Medrano, always in permanent crisis. The book was fully written one night (the night of the 25th to 26 May 2007), under the alchemy of the shut blinds, the shaking hands and the nerves on top. He thought of committing suicide and, with the sole purpose of avoiding it, he started writing a little poem every ten or fifteen minutes: he had the intuition that this would be the only way he could reach the dawn alive, that this and no other was the valid formula to survival. In the depths of the verb, according to Medrano, was a bear. It was a very big bear, and he would only calm down when he heard, from the author's lips, the word: "j-e-l-l-y". Beyond the bear, Medrano says, someone was snapping his fingers restlessly; probably the consequence of some strange Blues or an irreverent Jazz. Divided in episodes –like clouds or secrets in the present constellation- a woman shoved a living mouse in her vagina. Testimony of all this is recorded in this text, weird above any other condition that, in equal or very similar tuning, could stay related to other famous weirdnesses: Juego de cartas (Card Game) by Max Jacob, Cente mille millards de poems(Hundreds of Thousands of Poems) by Raymond Queneau, Libro de los agujeros (Book of the Holes) by Francisco Pino or La prosse du Transsiberien (Transiberian Prose) by Blaise Cendrars. Only for very ephemeral sane individuals.

Agua me falta: Tragedias & Neurosis 1999-2007 (Got No Water: Tragedies & Neurosis 1999-2007)
Restless author –moreover with himself- and dense literature. Each new book by Medrano seems to be a new reason for the fire and its spigot. Extremely original voice in the contemporary literary panorama, polemic author in a tradition where heterodoxy is brought to the limit; theorist and executor of his own polarities, constant flow of books and obsessive-maniac with all sorts of literary material. Many will be surprised with this secret poetry book, among all his previous books, for which he confesses: "I've given everything here, while I was gusting and airing in a good number of other proses and dreams, personal persistent cartographies and signs that will soon see the light shining  over the water of its immediate publication". Medrano's voice, metallic in all its forms, polymorphic in its expression, for better or worse, is already a sign in the midst of a lethargic society, where similar voices rise "with the safety of those who can only fear themselves", as a certain Nadal Award winner of the most suggestive, provoking and immediate Spanish narrative, said about the author. Eight years of metal in vein, blue blindness of someone who delves deeper into himself, to the point of fanaticism.

Novels

El Clítoris de Camille (Camille's Clitoris)
Delirious, comical, brilliant, absurd, all amalgamated in the same identity, magic and undecipherable. The story of Dante Cornellius, character obsessed with excrements and whose hair, he believes, changes color every instant, will not leave anyone indifferent. It was greeted by Pere Gimferrer, literary director of Seix Barral as a new wave of fresh wind in contemporary young narrative. Ricardo Senabre underlined the twists and turns or stylistic games of the author in the El Cultural section of El Mundo, together with his passion for the defeated of every condition, the bohemians without solution, the damned who have only themselves. "How hard it is to kill oneself when someone truly wishes to die", whispered the author in one of his many presentations, apparently exhausted. With a bit of metaliterature, a lot of tragedy, complete "esperpento", black or medranic mass and the green urine of fools, the author managed to make an endless number of critics doubt, who did not know in what limits to frame this text. "What the hell is this?", asked certain reviewers in their blinking chronicles. The madness of the text, miraculously, cannot be untied of the very madness that generates the difficult understanding of it, or at least the most visible attempt. Surprisingly, perhaps in the height of the tragedy, some have described it as "prodigious humor". Brilliant text, hallucinated, the first reference of which would be Radiguet's Le Diable au Corps (The Devil in the Flesh).

Puta albina colgada del brazo de Francisco Umbral (Albino Whore Hanging from Francisco Umbral's Arm)
Hunger, poverty, a miserable and sleazy pension in Hortaleza Street, mysterious death threats in the dirty mirror of a ruined bathroom, a celebrated woman of the Café Gijón, Francisco Umbral, his books, his work, his thoughts... What else does a young man need to reach the artist he has inside?

Samuel Lamata arrived to Madrid to dedicate himself exclusively to writing, to triumph in literature, but specially to spy on Umbral and to turn this city into a literary character. In the sleazy pension of Hortaleza Street where he lives, before going to bed, he often repeats to himself two sentences by Witold Gombrowicz. The first: "I wasn’t anything at all, therefore I could allow myself everything". The second: "Since I practice literature I always had to destroy someone else in order to save myself". This is how his vibrating search stars, his literary search, vital search, where he, as narrator with a wide literary register (Borges, Kafka, Gómez de la Serna, etc.) tries to find the real Francisco Umbral, find out who hides behind the character of Maruja Lapoint (pseudonym that corresponds to a certain bohemian celebrity of the Café Gijón) and, finally, try to uncover his own identity...

Short stories

Los sueños diurnos. Manual para amantes, pobres y asesinos (Daylight Dreams. Instructions for lovers, beggars and murderers)
This book, presented by Javier Tomeo and Pere Gimferrer in Barcelona, happened to have a brilliant reception by a great number of young people. It could not be more colossal and pretentious: 300 microstories, each of them with their own plotlines, with over 600 characters. Texts that, following the turbulent path of Robert Walser's micrograms written in the Herisau and Waldeau mental hospitals, those texts that Walser used to write on any kind of surface (receipts, cards, flaps, notepads), Medrano writes constantly on napkins and compiles them all in this volume. "Tired of other genres, I was looking for something rather brief, and thus, I turned into a literary napkin machine in the worst whorehouses. I think I wrote over ten thousand, although only three hundred appear in the book. The others must have been stolen or lost. I still haven’t been able to stop", he said during the presentation. It's amazing, how many quotes he operates with in the texts: cult characters in total marginality, a revision of high culture in the worst trances. Singular and effervescent optic of the classics. All kinds of abuses, The author quoted Nijinsky that morning in full effervescence: "I want to make love to my daughter and my mother". In several shopping centers the book was being sold with a couple of extra pages, stapled, which the editorial did not commercialize. Some of the texts boiled in their daring nature. Medrano quoted a sweating Kafka: "At some point, there is no return anymore. That is the point one has to reach". The edition, impeccable, shines with several illustrations by Egon Schiele.

La soledad no tiene edad (Loneliness Has No Age)
I don’t know what I am. I don’t know who I am. Sometimes, in rainy days, I take my shoe off and, when I press it against my ear for a while, I can talk with Jean Cocteau, Antonin Artaud or Franz Kafka. Cocteau has the voice of wet grass in spring. Kafka, nevertheless, hit by barbiturates, is almost mute, no voice at all: I’d say he is just a little feverish thread more in the nothingness. "I am what I leave on the way", I said one morning to some drunkard who looked at me with innocent animal eyes, thinking  I’d try to sell him bibles or something. I used to wake up very early, I liked seeing the junkies, fucked up, give them therapeutical kisses, and dangerous kisses for the prostitutes: only the resisting ones, the ones who were not defeated by the previous night yet. Now I always wake up late. The time these stories were written (1997-2007) is the time in which I thought of myself as the greatest hurricane to hit the streets of crisis, the deep journeys of fear and the sewers of helplessness: all the alleys of madness. Still today, I believe we are only fear and sex. What is in between, if you don’t get scared, you can find it in these pages: where violence is chopped without any kind of hurry, making slices of oneself to go on living. And where the hands tremble, for being golden. And where the mirrors, so nice, only give us magnificent putrefaction.

Sobrevivir puede ser divertido (Surviving Can Be Amusing)
Heterodox and caustic stories, collection of tender and intolerable guys, surrealist and hyperrealist situations... Doubts strike us with each new story we read, disconcert us because we doubt whether we should laugh or cry; because we cannot know if we are detached from these characters or they nest crouching in our soul.

Surviving can be amusing is a cocktail where sensibility, anger, prodigious observation and imagination skills, which we should gulp down in some exclusive bar in company of a werewolf.

External links 
Official website

1978 births
Living people
People from Oviedo
Spanish poets
Spanish columnists
University of Oviedo alumni
Spanish male poets